Nerissus is a genus of leaf beetles in the subfamily Eumolpinae. It is known from Africa.

Species
 Nerissus affinis Lefèvre, 1889
 Nerissus bicoloratus Jacoby, 1901
 Nerissus carnapi (Kuntzen, 1912)
 Nerissus conformis Weise, 1907
 Nerissus favareli Pic, 1938
 Nerissus femoralis Lefèvre, 1875
 Nerissus gabonensis Jacoby, 1893
 Nerissus globulatus (Kuntzen, 1912)
 Nerissus griseoscutellatus Karsch, 1882
 Nerissus hispidulus Lefèvre, 1886
 Nerissus latepubens Pic, 1939
 Nerissus lefevrei Jacoby, 1895
 Nerissus leucocyclus Kuntzen, 1912
 Nerissus maculosus Pic, 1938
 Nerissus rugosus Bryant, 1956
 Nerissus saegeri Burgeon, 1941
 Nerissus sculptilis (J. Thomson, 1858)
 Nerissus strigosus Chapuis, 1874
 Nerissus tuberculatus Jacoby, 1901
 Nerissus tuberculatus tuberculatus Jacoby, 1901
 Nerissus tuberculatus uelensis Burgeon, 1941
 Nerissus uniformis Pic, 1952
 Nerissus viridipennis Jacoby, 1903

References

Eumolpinae
Chrysomelidae genera
Taxa named by Félicien Chapuis
Beetles of Africa